Andrei Viktorovich Ryzhikov (born 10 March 1988) is a Russian professional football coach and a former player. He is the goalkeeping coach at FC Kolomna.

Club career
He played in the Russian Football National League for FC Mordovia Saransk in 2010.

Personal life
He is the younger brother of Sergei Ryzhikov.

External links
 
 Profile
 

1988 births
People from Shebekino
Living people
Russian footballers
Association football goalkeepers
FC Rotor Volgograd players
FC Saturn Ramenskoye players
FC Mordovia Saransk players
FC Torpedo Moscow players
FC Neftekhimik Nizhnekamsk players
FC Tekstilshchik Ivanovo players
FC Energomash Belgorod players
FC Sokol Saratov players
FC Olimp-Dolgoprudny players
Sportspeople from Belgorod Oblast